Elections were held in Hastings County, Ontario on October 24, 2022, in conjunction with municipal elections across the province.

Hastings County Council
Hastings County Council consists of the mayors and reeves of the 14 constituent municipalities.

Bancroft
The following were the results for mayor of Bancroft.

Carlow/Mayo
The following were the results for mayor of Carlow/Mayo.

Centre Hastings
Tom Deline was re-elected mayor of Centre Hastings by acclamation.

Deseronto
Dan Johnston was re-elected mayor of Deseronto by acclamation.

Faraday
Dennis Purcell was re-elected mayor of Faraday by acclamation.

Hastings Highlands
The following were the results for mayor of Hastings Highlands.

Limerick
The following were the results for mayor of Limerick.

Madoc
The following were the results for mayor of Madoc.

Marmora and Lake
The following were the results for mayor of Marmora and Lake.

Stirling-Rawdon
The following were the results for mayor of Stirling-Rawdon.

Tudor and Cashel
The following were the results for mayor of Tudor and Cashel.

Tweed
Don DeGenova was acclaimed as mayor of Tweed.

Tyendinaga
The following were the results for reeve of Tyendinaga.

Wollaston
The following were the results for mayor of Wollaston.

References

Hastings
Hastings County